La Estrella is a Chilean town and commune in Cardenal Caro Province, O'Higgins Region.

Demographics
Of these, 1,380 (32.7%) lived in urban areas and 2,841 (67.3%) in rural areas. The population grew by 51.9% (1,442 persons) between the 1992 and 2002 censuses.

Administration
As a commune, La Estrella is a third-level administrative division of Chile administered by a municipal council, headed by an alcalde who is directly elected every four years. The 2021-2024 alcalde is Angélica Silva Arrué.

References

External links
  Municipality of La Estrella

Communes of Chile
Populated places in Cardenal Caro Province